Marleen Maria van Iersel (born 7 January 1988) is a Dutch professional beach volleyball player born in Breda.

Career
Iersel began her career playing indoor volleyball before switching to the beach volleyball in 2001. In 2003, she was selected by the Sourcy Volleybalschool. With her playing partner Jennifer Waninge she qualified for the Pattaya Under-18 World Championships in Thailand finishing in fifth place.

In 2004 Iersel again qualified for the Under-18 World Championships in Termoli partnering with Margo Wiltens. This time they reached the semi finals finishing in fourth position. Later that year she qualified for the Under-21 World Championships in Porto Santo finishing fourth.

Iersel teamed up with Marloes Wesselink in 2005 playing in the Eredivisie of beach volleyball in the Netherlands (the highest league in the country). Their first World Tour event was in Gstaad finishing 57th. The pair won the Dutch Under-20 national championships in Almere.

Iersel entered the Under-20s European Championships in Israel eventually winning the event and taking her first international gold medal. A few weeks later at the Under-19s World Championships under 19 in Saint-Quay-Portrieux she finished in 5th position. Her final 2005 event was the Under-21s World Championships in Brazil where she finished 9th. Along with Wesselink she received the award for Beach Volleyball Talents 2005.

In 2006 Iersel travelled to Marseille to play in a FIVB World Tour event for the first time, finishing 41st. At the European Championship Tour event in Valencia she finished in 21st position. Later that year she played in the Under-21s World Championships in Mysłowice winning the bronze medal. She stayed in Poland to play the Warsaw FIVB World Tour event, finishing 33rd.

At the Under-20s World Championships in Bermuda Van Iersel played alongside Daniëlle Remmers. The tournament was shortened from 7–10 September 2006 to 7–9 September because of the Tropical Storm Florence which was likely to hit the island on 10 or 11 September. Their semi final match was won by two sets to love, which secured them a place in the final against Alice Rohkamper and Becchara Palmer from Australia losing 2–1.

Professional career

Summer Olympics
At the 2012 Summer Olympics, she teamed with Sanne Keizer.  They qualified from group D.  Unfortunately, they were then drawn against Misty May-Treanor and Kerri Walsh Jennings, and lost 2–0 in the first knockout round.

Marleen van Iersel participated in the 2016 Summer Olympics in Rio together with her teammate Madelein Meppelink, with whom she had teamed since 2014. They made it to the round of 16, and lost to the Swiss team of Heidrich and Zumkehr in 3 sets (21–19, 13–21, 10–15)

Personal life
Iersel and her wife Myrthe Ramond got married in 2016. The couple have a son.

References

External links
 Official site
 
 
 

1988 births
Living people
Dutch women's beach volleyball players
Sportspeople from Breda
Beach volleyball players at the 2012 Summer Olympics
Olympic beach volleyball players of the Netherlands
Beach volleyball players at the 2016 Summer Olympics
Lesbian sportswomen
Dutch LGBT sportspeople
LGBT volleyball players
20th-century Dutch women
21st-century Dutch women